Lost Islands is a 2008 Israeli film by the writer and director Reshef Levi. The film is named after the Australian television series The Lost Islands, which was broadcast in Israel, when the plot takes place. The film was nominated for 14 Ophir Awards, of which it won four.

The film takes place in the early eighties in Kfar Saba, and tells the story of the Levy family, focusing on twin sons who fall in love with the same girl.

According to Levy, the film is loosely based on personal experiences of his family, with its many children.

Soundtrack
As a film taking place in the early eighties, its soundtrack consists of typical songs of that time.
 The Lost Islands theme song
 Abracadabra
 Love Boat Theme
 Aquarius 
 Only You
 Don't You Want Me
 I Ran
 Forever Young
 Will You
 Moonlight Shadow
 Total Eclipse of the Heart
 Alone Again (Naturally)
 Come On Eilleen
 I Want to Know What Love Is
 Mad World
 It Must be Love

External links
 

2008 films
Israeli comedy-drama films
Films set in the 1980s